Double Static Rook (相居飛車 ai-ibisha) positions are shogi openings in which both players use a Static Rook position.

Relation to castles

Most Static Rook openings coincide with a castle development on the player's left side of board.

In Double Static Rook openings, a Static Rook player's king is initially threatened from above by the opponent's rook which has remained on its starting square.

Castles in Double Static Rook openings have a wide variety of forms that are dependent upon the specific opening used. Some openings like Fortress and Bishop Exchange openings have the king moved leftward away from the rook in compact castles while openings like Double Wing Attack and Side Pawn Capture have rather minimal castle formations with much less king safety in a trade off of defending wider areas within the Static Rook side's camp in order to defend against future piece drops.

Double Static Rook openings

Double Wing Attack

Double Wing Attack is a Double Static Rook opening where both sides play Static Rook with the first several moves on each side being identical or very similar. Both sides advance their rook pawns to the middle rank 5. Then, golds are moved to defend each bishop's head. Afterwards, pawns on both rook files exchange. Then, the joseki branches off into several different josekis and strategies. Double Wing is most commonly played in modern times with both players' bishop diagonals closed initially.

Double Wing Attack is one of the oldest Double Static Rook openings dating from around 1625 and preceding other openings such as Snowroof, Fortress, and Bishop Exchange.

Tsukada Special

Tsukada Special is a Floating Rook variant of the Double Wing Attack opening developed by professional Yasuaki Tsukada.

No Guard

Side Pawn Capture

Side Pawn Capture has the same form as a Double Wing Attack opening with both players' bishop diagonals open. (Double Wing Attack with open bishop diagonals was more commonly played before the twentieth century while in modern times it usually keeps the bishop diagonals closed initially.) However, it deviates from Double Wing Attack when one player (usually Black) or both players capture the opponent's side pawn with their rook in a gambit move. The side pawns referred to are the pawns that are advanced in order to open both players' bishop diagonal (on 44 for White and 76 for Black). The games often have a different character compared with Double Wing Attack and can often feature very dynamic play.

Snowroof 

The Snowroof strategy is named after the use of a Snowroof castle. This old opening predates the Fortress opening and was especially popular before the 1950s after which its popularity waned. Recently, the second decade of the 21st century has seen a surge of renewed interest in the strategy among professional shogi players.

Fortress 

Fortress is a Static Rook opening as well as the name of a castle associated with the opening.

When both players use a Fortress opening, it is known as a Double Fortress.

The board diagram here shows the standardized first 24 moves of a typical Double Fortress opening where both players aim to build Fortress castles. Here the Fortress castles are not yet complete. At this point, the Double Fortress opening branches off into numerous strategies.

Bishop Exchange

Bishop Exchange is a Double Static Rook opening in which each player's bishop is captured so that they keep their bishops in hand.

Static Bishop Left Mino

Static Bishop Left Mino (居角左美濃 ikaku hidari minō) is a Static Rook strategy used in Double Static Rook games by White when Black attempts a Fortress strategy.

References

Bibliography

External links

 YouTube: HIDETCHI's Shogi Openings: Lesson #17: Castles for Double Static Rook Opening

Shogi openings